5th SDFCS Awards 
December 20, 2000

Best Film: 
 Almost Famous 
The 5th San Diego Film Critics Society Awards, given by the San Diego Film Critics Society on December 20, 2000, honored the best in film for 2000.

Winners
Best Actor: 
Russell Crowe - Gladiator
Best Actress (tie): 
Laura Linney - You Can Count on Me
Julia Roberts - Erin Brockovich
Best Cinematography: 
Gladiator - John Mathieson
Best Director: 
Cameron Crowe - Almost Famous
Best Film: 
Almost Famous
Best Foreign Language Film: 
The Colour of Paradise (Rang-e khoda) • Iran
Best Screenplay - Adapted: 
Chocolat - Robert Nelson Jacobs
Best Screenplay - Original: 
Almost Famous - Cameron Crowe
Best Supporting Actor: 
Benicio del Toro - Traffic
Best Supporting Actress: 
Frances McDormand - Almost Famous
Body of Work Award: 
Joaquin Phoenix - Gladiator, Quills and The Yards

2
2000 film awards
2000 in American cinema